The varsovienne, also known as the varsouvienne or varsoviana, is a slow, graceful dance in  time with an accented downbeat in alternate measures. It combines elements of the waltz, mazurka, and polka. The dance originated around 1850 in Warsaw, Poland. The words varsovienne and varsoviana are French and Spanish feminine adjectives, respectively, meaning 'from Warsaw'. The dance was popular in 19th-century America, where it was danced to the tune Put Your Little Foot.  It quickly became a favorite folk dance in the Scandinavian countries as well.  The unique armhold by the same name – also known as the promenade hold – is used in other dance styles such as the American square dance, contra dance, and some ballroom dances.

Henry Ford's Dance Orchestra recorded a piece titled Varsovienne. 
The Albion Dance Band recorded a varsoviana tune on their 1977 album The Prospect Before Us.
A varsoviana tune plays an important role in Tennessee Williams' play A Streetcar Named Desire.

References

Polish dances